Holywood is a civil parish and townland (of ) in County Down, Northern Ireland. It is situated in the historic barony of Castlereagh Lower and covers some areas that are now in Belfast.

Settlements
The civil parish contains the town of Holywood.

Townlands
The civil parish contains the following townlands:

Ballycloghan
Ballycultraw
Ballydavey
Ballygrainey
Ballyhackamore
Ballykeel
Ballymaghan
Ballymenagh
Ballymisert
Ballyrobert
Craigavad
Holywood
Killeen
Knocknagoney
Strandtown

See also
List of civil parishes of County Down

References

 
Holywood, County Down